Gashnian (also Romanized as Gashnīān, Geshneyān, Geshnīān, and Geshnīyān) is a village in Lafur Rural District, North Savadkuh County, Mazandaran Province, Iran. At the 2006 census, its population was 110, in 46 families.

References 

Populated places in Savadkuh County